Cousso Espérance Agbo (born 14 May 1995), known as Espérance Agbo, is an Ivorian footballer plays as a forward for  Indian Women's League club Gokulam Kerala FC and the Ivory Coast women's national team.

Honours

Gokulam Kerala
Indian Women's League: 2019–20

See also
List of Ivory Coast women's international footballers

References 

1995 births
Living people
Place of birth missing (living people)
Ivorian women's footballers
Women's association football forwards
Gokulam Kerala FC Women players
Ivory Coast women's international footballers
Ivorian expatriate women's footballers
Ivorian expatriate sportspeople in India
Expatriate women's footballers in India
Indian Women's League players